Fabian Göranson is a Swedish illustrator and publisher of graphic novels and comics.

His comics have been published in Swedish magazines Galago, Ordfront and Arbetaren.

Bibliography
Kirurgi (2008)
Inferno (2010)

External links
 Kolik Förlag
 Private blog

Living people
Year of birth missing (living people)
Place of birth missing (living people)
Swedish illustrators
21st-century Swedish male artists